Beaver Dam (officially, Township of Beaver Dam) is a township in Cumberland County, North Carolina, United States. It is situated at an elevation of 115 feet (35 m).

References

Populated places in Cumberland County, North Carolina